Philip David Lang (born December 16, 1929) was an American politician who was a member of the Oregon House of Representatives.

Lang was born in Portland in 1929 and served from 1961 to 1979, including a stint as speaker of the house from 1975 to 1978. He was an insurance company executive. He also served in the United States Air Force and as a trooper with the Oregon State Police upon his graduation from Lewis and Clark College.

Lang is a former chairman of the Oregon Liquor Control Commission and of the National Alcohol Beverage Control Association.

References

1929 births
Living people
Democratic Party members of the Oregon House of Representatives
Politicians from Portland, Oregon
United States Air Force airmen
Lewis & Clark College alumni
Oregon police officers